Stationary Odyssey was an American alternative rock band from Evansville, Indiana, United States, composed of Aaron Tanner and Brett Siler. Their debut EP, Komondor, was named one of the top 15 Most Important Releases of 2004 in Japan (Duotone Records).

In December 2006, Stationary Odyssey released a free, downloadable EP that contained a remix by Kramer (Ween, Butthole Surfers).

After touring with Frank Black in early 2007, Mike Farmer (aka Kentucky Prophet) supplied vocals on two Stationary Odyssey songs for a split EP with Child Bite (Suburban Sprawl Music).

In early 2007, the band had features in both Verbicide magazine and Modern Fix.

Tanner produced a Sonic Youth tribute album, Confuse Yr Idols (Narnack Records). The tribute debuted at No. 44 on the Canadian college charts (Chartattack) and No. 109 on the US college charts (CMJ). It featured a track from Stationary Odyssey as well as Elf Power, Yoshimi P-we of The Boredoms (Saicobab), and Steel Pole Bath Tub.

Members
Brett Siler - guitar, additional instrumentation
Aaron Tanner - bass,  additional instrumentation

Additional contributors
Jeff Acker
Luke Bickers
Nathan Brown
Damon Dawson
Aaron Distler
Mike Farmer
Jesse Gallamore
Josh Hood
Shawn Knight
Mike Langlie
Dave Melkonian
Casey Paquet
Brint Powell
Kraig Sagan
Chris Schlarb
Scott Siler
Jesse Southerland
Jackson Tanner
Aaron Vukovich

Discography

LPs
More or Less Is More (2005)
Komondor LP (2006)
Head! Foot! And The Pink Axe (2006)
Sons of Boy (2009)
Live Voodoo Hex (2010)

EPs
Komondor (EP) (2003)
Perpetual of The Retired Evermore (2004)
This Is As Good As It Gets (2005)
Terror On The Hell Loop (2006)
Physical Education Split EP with Child Bite (2007)
Johnfriend (2009)

Singles
"Demon Oar" b/w "The Everybody" (2012)
"Spongelike Wonderland" b/w "El Boxeo" (2004)

Imports
Perpetual of The Retired Evermore (Japan) (2004)

References

External links

Joyful Noise Recordings

Musical groups from Indiana
Evansville, Indiana
Joyful Noise Recordings artists